Eloise Smyth  is a British actress best known for her role of Flora in the television series The Frankenstein Chronicles and as Lucy Wells in the television drama series Harlots.

Early life
Eloise Valentine Smyth, currently living in London, is the youngest daughter of Cathal Joseph Smyth (AKA Chas Smash), of the ska band Madness, and Joanna Brown.

Career
Smyth began her acting career in 2012, in British crime drama film Ill Manors alongside Riz Ahmed, Ed Skrein and Jo Hartley. In 2013, Smyth was lead actress when playing the role of Jess in the Jane Linfoot directed short film Sea View for Sigma Films/BFI, which was nominated for BAFTA Award for Best Short Film in 2013. The same film won the Best British Short Film Award at the Leeds International Film Festival, 2013.
In 2015, Smyth landed a recurring role as Flora on the television series The Frankenstein Chronicles appearing alongside Sean Bean.
 
In 2016, Smyth secured a main role as Lucy Wells in 24 episodes of Harlots, a series about a brothel in 18th-century London. In 2017, Smyth played Yeva Podnikov for nine episodes of Sky Atlantic television series Fortitude.

In 2021, Smyth played a main role of Akae in the sci-fi film I Am Mortal (formerly titled The Code). The same year, Smyth  starred alongside Jonathan Rhys Meyers in the Stephan Rick directed The Good Neighbor, a film in which her character 'Vanessa' forms a romantic bond with her sister's killer.

Filmography

Film

Television

Nominations and awards
Smyth was lead actress in Sea View, which was nominated for Best Short Film at the 67th British Academy Film Awards in 2014.

References

External links

Independent Talent – Eloise Smyth
Eloise Smyth - twitter
Eloise Smyth interview during filming of iLL Manors(2012)

1995 births
Living people
21st-century English actresses
British television actresses
British film actresses